Days of Heaven is a 1978 American romantic period drama film written and directed by Terrence Malick, and starring Richard Gere, Brooke Adams, Sam Shepard and Linda Manz. Set in 1916, it tells the story of Bill and Abby, lovers who travel to the Texas Panhandle to harvest crops for a wealthy farmer. Bill persuades Abby to claim the fortune of the dying farmer by tricking him into a false marriage.

Days of Heaven was Malick's second feature film, after Badlands (1973), and was produced on a budget of $3 million. Production was particularly troublesome, with a tight shooting schedule in Canada in 1976 and significant budget constraints. Film editing took Malick a lengthy two years, due to difficulty with achieving a general flow and assembly of the scenes. This was eventually solved by incorporating improvised narration from teen Linda Manz. The film was scored by Ennio Morricone and photographed by Néstor Almendros and Haskell Wexler.

Days of Heaven received positive reviews on its original theatrical release. Its photography was widely praised, although a small number of critics considered only this aspect to be worthy of high praise. It was not a significant commercial success, but did win an Academy Award for Best Cinematography along with three nominations for the score, costume design and sound. Malick also won the Best Director Award at the Cannes Film Festival.

Days of Heaven has since become one of the most acclaimed films of its decade, particularly for its cinematography. It continues to appear in polls of the best films ever made, and appeared at #49 on a BBC poll of the greatest American films. In 2007, the film was selected for preservation in the United States National Film Registry by the Library of Congress as being "culturally, historically, or aesthetically significant".

Plot
In 1916, Chicago manual laborer Bill knocks down and kills a boss in the steel mill where he works, then flees to the Texas Panhandle with his girlfriend Abby and young sister Linda. Bill and Abby pretend to be siblings to prevent gossip. The three are hired as part of a large group of seasonal workers by a rich, shy farmer. Bill overhears a doctor telling the farmer he has only a year to live, although the nature of the illness is not specified.

When the farmer falls in love with Abby, Bill encourages her to marry him so they can inherit his money. They thus marry and Bill stays as her "brother". The farmer's foreman suspects the scheme. The farmer's health unexpectedly remains stable, foiling Bill's plans. Eventually, the farmer discovers Bill's true relationship with Abby; meanwhile, Abby has begun to fall in love with her husband. When a locust swarm and fires destroy his wheat fields, the incensed farmer chases Bill with a gun, but Bill kills him with a screwdriver, then flees with Abby and Linda.

The foreman and police pursue and eventually find them; Bill is shot and killed while running. Abby inherits the farmer's estate and leaves Linda at a boarding school. Abby leaves town on a train with soldiers departing for World War I. Linda runs away from school with a friend from the farm.

Cast

 Richard Gere as Bill
 Brooke Adams as Abby
 Sam Shepard as The Farmer
 Linda Manz as Linda
 Robert Wilke as Farm Foreman
 Stuart Margolin as Mill Foreman
 Timothy Scott as Harvest Hand
 Doug Kershaw as Fiddler
 Richard Libertini as Vaudeville Leader

Production

Jacob Brackman introduced fellow producer Bert Schneider to Terrence Malick in 1975. On a trip to Cuba, Schneider and Malick began conversations that would lead to the development of Days of Heaven. Malick had tried and failed to get Dustin Hoffman or Al Pacino to star in the film, and John Travolta auditioned for and won the lead role of Bill, but ABC-TV wouldn't let him out of his contract for his series Welcome Back Kotter. Schneider agreed to produce the film. He and Malick cast young actors Richard Gere and Brooke Adams and actor/playwright Sam Shepard for the lead roles. Paramount Pictures CEO Barry Diller wanted Schneider to produce films for him and agreed to finance Days of Heaven. At the time, the studio was heading in a new direction. They were hiring new production heads who had worked in network television and, according to former production chief Richard Sylbert, "[manufacturing] product aimed at your knees". Despite the change in direction, Schneider was able to secure a deal with Paramount by guaranteeing the budget and taking personal responsibility for all overages. "Those were the kind of deals I liked to make ... because then I could have final cut and not talk to nobody about why we're gonna use this person instead of that person", Schneider said.

Malick admired cinematographer Néstor Almendros's work on The Wild Child (1970) and wanted him to shoot Days of Heaven. Almendros was impressed by Malick's knowledge of photography and willingness to use little studio lighting. The two men modeled the film's cinematography after silent films, which often used natural light. They drew inspiration from painters such as Johannes Vermeer, Edward Hopper (particularly his House by the Railroad), and Andrew Wyeth, as well as photo-reporters from the start of the 20th century.

Principal photography
Production began in the late summer of 1976. Although the film was set in Texas, the exteriors were shot in southwestern Alberta at Whiskey Gap, a ghost town near the Montana border, and a final scene was shot in Calgary on the grounds of Heritage Park Historical Village.

Jack Fisk designed and built the mansion from plywood in the wheat fields and the smaller houses where the workers lived. The mansion was not a facade, as was normally the custom, but authentically recreated inside and out with period colors: brown, mahogany and dark wood for the interiors. Patricia Norris designed and made the period costumes from used fabrics and old clothes to avoid the artificial look of studio-made costumes.

According to Almendros, the production was not "rigidly prepared", allowing for improvisation. Daily call sheets were not very detailed and the schedule changed to suit the weather. This upset some Hollywood crew members not used to working this way. Most of the crew were used to a "glossy style of photography" and felt frustrated because Almendros did not give them much work. On a daily basis, he asked them to turn off the lights they had prepared for him. Some crew members said that Almendros and Malick did not know what they were doing. The tension led to some of the crew quitting the production. Malick supported what Almendros was doing and pushed the look of the film further, taking away more lighting aids, and leaving the image bare.

Due to union regulations in North America, Almendros was not allowed to operate the camera. With Malick, he would plan out and rehearse movements of the camera and the actors. Almendros would stand near the main camera and give instructions to the camera operators. Almendros was gradually losing his sight by the time shooting began. To evaluate his set-ups, "he had one of his assistants take Polaroids of the scene, then examined them through very strong glasses". According to Almendros, Malick wanted "a very visual movie. The story would be told through visuals. Very few people really want to give that priority to image. Usually the director gives priority to the actors and the story, but here the story was told through images".

Much of the film would be shot during magic hour, which Almendros called: "a euphemism, because it's not an hour but around 25 minutes at the most. It is the moment when the sun sets, and after the sun sets and before it is night. The sky has light, but there is no actual sun. The light is very soft, and there is something magic about it. It limited us to around twenty minutes a day, but it did pay on the screen. It gave some kind of magic look, a beauty and romanticism." Lighting was integral to filming, and helped evoke the painterly quality of the landscapes in the film. A vast majority of the scenes were filmed late in the afternoon or after sunset, with the sky silhouetting the actors faces, which would otherwise be difficult to see. Interior scenes that feature light coming in from the outside, were shot using artificial light to maintain the consistency of that intruding light. The "magic look", however, would also extend to interior scenes, which did occasionally utilize natural light.

For the shot in the "locusts" sequence, where the insects rise into the sky, the film-makers dropped peanut shells from helicopters. They had the actors walk backwards while running the film in reverse through the camera. When it was projected, everything moved forward except the locusts. For the close-ups and insert shots, thousands of live locusts were used which had been captured and supplied by Canada's Department of Agriculture.

While the photography yielded the director satisfactory results critically, the rest of the production was difficult from the start. The actors and crew reportedly viewed Malick as cold and distant. After two weeks of shooting, Malick was so disappointed with the dailies, he "decided to toss the script, go Leo Tolstoy instead of Fyodor Dostoyevsky, wide instead of deep [and] shoot miles of film with the hope of solving the problems in the editing room."

The harvesting machines constantly broke down, which resulted in shooting beginning late in the afternoon, allowing for only a few hours of light before it was too dark to go on. One day, two helicopters were scheduled to drop peanut shells that were to simulate locusts on film; however, Malick decided to shoot period cars instead. He kept the helicopters on hold at great cost. Production was lagging behind, with costs exceeding the $3,000,000 budget by about $800,000, and Schneider had already mortgaged his home in order to cover the overages.

The production ran so late that both Almendros and camera operator John Bailey had to leave due to a prior commitment on François Truffaut's The Man Who Loved Women (1977). Almendros approached cinematographer Haskell Wexler to complete the film. They worked together for a week so that Wexler could get familiar with the film's visual style.

Wexler was careful to match Almendros' work, but he did make some exceptions. "I did some hand held shots on a Panaflex", he said, "[for] the opening of the film in the steel mill. I used some diffusion. Nestor didn't use any diffusion. I felt very guilty using the diffusion and having the feeling of violating a fellow cameraman." Although half the finished picture was footage shot by Wexler, he received only credit for "additional photography", much to his chagrin. The credit denied him any chance of an Academy Award for his work on Days of Heaven. Wexler sent film critic Roger Ebert a letter "in which he described sitting in a theater with a stop-watch to prove that more than half of the footage" was his. Later in life, however, he had accepted Almendros receiving credit as cinematographer:

I thought, "Well, God damn it. I should get credit with Nestor on it." And then I had talks with the producer, Bert Schneider, and he said, "Look, you've won Oscars already. What the hell, Nestor should have it." So then I said to myself, "Well, Haskell, you're being a little selfish." And the real thing that convinced me not to say anything ... was that Nestor set the tone of the film. It was actually me maintaining his style to a certain extent, so if there was to be an award, which we didn't know there would be, he should get it. And I'm so happy now — particularly since he is no longer with us — that that happened.

Post-production

Following the completion of principal photography, the editing process took more than two years to complete. Malick had a difficult time shaping the film and getting the pieces to go together. Schneider reportedly showed some footage to director Richard Brooks, who was considering Gere for a role in Looking for Mr. Goodbar.

According to Schneider, the editing for Days of Heaven took so long that "Brooks cast Gere, shot, edited and released Looking for Mr. Goodbar while Malick was still editing". A breakthrough came when Malick experimented with voice-overs from Linda Manz's character, similar to what he had done with Sissy Spacek in Badlands. According to editor Billy Weber, Malick jettisoned much of the film's dialogue, replacing it with Manz's voice-over, which served as an oblique commentary on the story. After a year, Malick had to call the actors to Los Angeles, California to shoot inserts of shots that were necessary but had not been filmed in Alberta. The finished film thus includes close-ups of Shepard that were shot under a freeway overpass. The underwater shot of Gere's falling face down into the river was shot in a large aquarium in Spacek's living room.

Meanwhile, Schneider was disappointed with Malick. He had confronted Malick numerous times about missed deadlines and broken promises. Due to further cost overruns, he had to ask Paramount for more money, which he preferred not to do. When they screened a demo for Paramount and made their pitch, the studio was impressed and reportedly "gave Malick a very sweet deal at the studio, carte blanche, essentially". Malick was not able to capitalize on the deal. He was so exhausted from working on the film that he moved to Paris with his girlfriend. He tried developing another project for Paramount, but after a substantial amount of work, he abandoned it. He did not make another film until 1998's The Thin Red Line 20 years later.

Soundtrack
The soundtrack for Days of Heaven is a strong reflection of the film's context. Ennio Morricone provided the film's score and received his first Academy Award nomination
in his soundtrack composing career for his work on the film. Morricone recalled the process as being "demanding" and said of Malick: "He didn't know me very well, so he made suggestions, and in some cases, gave musical solutions. This kind of annoyed me because he'd say: 'This thing ... try it with three flutes.' Something impossible! So, to humor him, I would do it with three flutes and then he'd decide to use my version after all. His was impossible or I would have written it myself. And more nitpicking like that which means he was very attentive and careful about music."

Morricone's score includes four recurring pieces: "Harvest", "Happiness", "The Honeymoon", and "The Return". "Harvest" is the film's main theme and opens with a melody that references "Aquarium", the seventh movement from Camille Saint-Saëns's Carnival of the Animals. The soundtrack was remastered and re-released in July 2011 on the Film Score Monthly label, in a two-disc edition and featuring excerpts of Manz's narration.

The country music heard during the harvest party is the Cajun tune "Swamp Dance", played and sung by Doug Kershaw. Kershaw is seen playing the fiddle with a broken bow-string.  Additional songs were contributed by guitarist Leo Kottke. Kottke was originally approached by Malick for the entire score, but declined.

Reception

Box office
Days of Heaven opened theatrically on September 13, 1978 at Cinema I on 3rd Avenue in New York City. It had screened the night before for sponsors and benefactors of the Film Society of Lincoln Center. It was shown at the Cannes Film Festival, in 1979, where Malick won the award for Best Director—making him the first American director to win the award since Jules Dassin in 1955 for Rififi (in a joint win shared with two other directors). The film was a commercial failure: its box office gross of $3,446,749 was only slightly more than it cost to make the film ($3 million), but Charles Bluhdorn who ran Paramount's parent company Gulf + Western, loved it so much he offered Malick $1 million for his next project, whatever it was.

Contemporary response
Critical reaction initially varied. Many critics found the film visually beautiful, but others found its story weak. Dave Kehr of The Chicago Reader wrote: "Terrence Malick's remarkably rich second feature is a story of human lives touched and passed over by the divine, told in a rush of stunning and precise imagery. Nestor Almendros's cinematography is as sharp and vivid as Malick's narration is elliptical and enigmatic. The result is a film that hovers just beyond our grasp—mysterious, beautiful, and, very possibly, a masterpiece".
Variety called the film "one of the great cinematic achievements of the 1970s." Gene Siskel of the Chicago Tribune also wrote that the film "truly tests a film critic's power of description ... Some critics have complained that the Days of Heaven story is too slight. I suppose it is, but, frankly, you don't think about it while the movie is playing". Time magazine's Frank Rich wrote, "Days of Heaven is lush with brilliant images". The periodical went on to name it one of the best films of 1978. Nick Schager of Slant Magazine has called it "the greatest film ever made."

Meanwhile, detractors targeted the film's direction of storyline and structure. In his review for The New York Times, Harold C. Schonberg wrote, "Days of Heaven never really makes up its mind what it wants to be. It ends up something between a Texas pastoral and Cavalleria Rusticana. Back of what basically is a conventional plot is all kinds of fancy, self-conscious cineaste techniques." 
Monica Eng of the Chicago Tribune criticized the lack of significant plot and stated "the story becomes secondary to the visuals".

The Chicago Sun-Times Roger Ebert responded to these criticisms in a reevaluation in 1997, saying:

Terrence Malick's "Days of Heaven" has been praised for its painterly images and evocative score, but criticized for its muted emotions: Although passions erupt in a deadly love triangle, all the feelings are somehow held at arm's length. This observation is true enough, if you think only about the actions of the adults in the story. But watching this 1978 film again recently, I was struck more than ever with the conviction that this is the story of a teenage girl, told by her, and its subject is the way that hope and cheer have been beaten down in her heart. We do not feel the full passion of the adults because it is not her passion: It is seen at a distance, as a phenomenon, like the weather, or the plague of grasshoppers that signals the beginning of the end.

Retrospective response
Days of Heaven was re-evaluated years after its original theatrical release and is considered a pioneering achievement in cinema. On Rotten Tomatoes the film has an approval rating of 93% based on reviews from 58 critics, with an average rating of 8.30/10. The website's consensus reads, "Illuminated by magic hour glow and wistful performances, Days of Heaven is a visual masterpiece that finds eloquent poetry in its spare scenario." On Metacritic it has a weighted average score of 93 out of 100 based on reviews from 19 critics, indicating "universal acclaim". It is frequently cited by critics and scholars, including Roger Ebert, as one of the most visually arresting films ever made; in 1997, Ebert added Days of Heaven to his Great Movies list. In 2007, the Library of Congress selected the film for preservation in the United States National Film Registry.

In 2012, Time included the film among the 20 new entries added to the magazine's "All-Time 100 Movies" list. The same year, Days of Heaven ranked #112 in the British Film Institute's decennial Sight & Sound critics' poll of the greatest films ever made, and #132 in the directors' poll of the same magazine. The New York Times placed the film on its Best 1000 Movies Ever list.

Awards

Per Academy custom, the award was given in the name of principal photographer Néstor Almendros. This was somewhat controversial, as previous winner Haskell Wexler also received credit on the film. Almendros mentioned Wexler in his acceptance speech, saying, "I would like to thank all the people that helped to get these images, all the camera operators and very specially Haskell Wexler who came at the end of the movie when I had to leave on a previous commitment."

American Film Institute recognition
 AFI's 100 Years...100 Movies—Nominated
 AFI's 100 Years...100 Passions—Nominated
 AFI's 100 Years...100 Movies (10th Anniversary Edition)—Nominated

Home media
Days of Heaven has been released on home video on different formats over the years. Its first notable release was on home video in the early 1980s, followed by various reissues in the 1980s and 1990s. In particular, the film was released on a special widescreen edition format on home video to preserve the film's original theatrical aspect ratio, which was uncommon for videotapes at the time, with majority of them being pan and scan, a technique that crops a portion of the image to focus on the more important composition. This often results in the side being cut out and the middle center being the only remaining part. Days of Heaven premiered on DVD on March 30, 1999 with no special features. The feature itself was presented in widescreen and released by Paramount Pictures, the copyright owner of the film itself. It was re-released on DVD in 2004, again without special supplements.

In 2007, the Criterion Collection released an exclusive special edition of the film, with digitally remastered sound and picture, supervised by Malick, editor Billy Weber and camera operator John Bailey. Bonus features include an audio commentary by art director Jack Fisk, editor Billy Weber, costume designer Patricia Norris, and casting director Dianne Crittenden; an audio interview with Richard Gere; video interviews with Sam Shepard, Haskell Wexler, and John Bailey; and a booklet featuring an essay on the film by Adrian Martin and an extract from Néstor Almendros' autobiography. The Criterion Collection also released a Blu-ray format of the film on March 7, 2010, with the same special features. The design art created by Criterion for the film's packaging marks a departure from the early video releases, featuring a still of Gere's character in the wheat fields, with the mansion on the horizon. The Criterion Collection release is now out of print.

References

Citations

Bibliography 
 Almendros, Nestor (1986). A Man with a Camera. Farrar, Straus and Giroux.
 Biskind, Peter (1998). Easy Riders, Raging Bulls. New York: Simon & Schuster.

Further reading
 Charlotte Crofts (2001), "From the 'Hegemony of the Eye' to the 'Hierarchy of Perception': The Reconfiguration of Sound and Image in Terrence Malick's Days of Heaven, Journal of Media Practice, 2:1, 19–29.
 Terry Curtis Fox (Sept./Oct. 1978), "The Last Ray of Light", Film Comment, 14:5, 27–28.
 Martin Donougho (Fall 1985), "West of Eden: Terrence Malick's Days of Heaven, Postscript: Essays in Film and the Humanities, 5:1, 17–30.
 Terrence Malick (1976), Days of Heaven, Script registered with the Writers Guild of America, 14 Apr; revised 2 Jun.
 Brooks Riley (Sept./Oct. 1978), "Interview with Nestor Almendros", Film Comment, 14:5, 28–31.
 Janet Wondra (Oct. 1994), "A Gaze Unbecoming: Schooling the Child for Femininity in Days of Heaven, Wide Angle, 16:4, 5–22.

External links

 
 
 
 
 "Days of Heaven: On Earth as It Is in Heaven"—an essay by Adrian Martin at the Criterion Collection
 "Days of Heaven: "Somewhere, I don't know, over there..." by Jim Emerson at RogerEbert.com (June 8, 2011)
 of Heaven'' essay by Daniel Eagan in America's Film Legacy: The Authoritative Guide to the Landmark Movies in the National Film Registry, A&C Black, 2010 , pages 747-748]

1978 romantic drama films
1978 films
American romantic drama films
1970s English-language films
Films about farmers
Films directed by Terrence Malick
Films scored by Ennio Morricone
Films set in 1916
Films set on farms
Films set in Texas
Films set in the 1910s
Films shot in Alberta
Films whose cinematographer won the Best Cinematography Academy Award
United States National Film Registry films
1970s American films